Mama Loves Papa is a 1933 American pre-Code comedy film directed by Norman Z. McLeod, with a story by Nunnally Johnson and Douglas MacLean, and a screenplay by MacLean, Keene Thompson, and Arthur Kober.  The film was produced by Paramount Pictures and stars Charlie Ruggles and Mary Boland.

Plot
While Wilbur Todd (Charlie Ruggles) is content with his middle class life, his wife Jessie (Mary Boland) aspires to a higher social standing. She insists he wear fine clothes because she believes that clothes make the man.  When his strange new clothes bring derision rather than admiration, and tired of his wife's constant nagging, Wilbur goes off on a drunken spree and innocently becomes involved with the village vamp, Mrs. McIntosh (Lilyan Tashman).

Cast
 Charlie Ruggles as Wilbur Todd 
 Mary Boland as Jessie Todd 
 Lilyan Tashman as Mrs. McIntosh 
 George Barbier as Mr. Kirkwood 
 Walter Catlett as Tom Walker 
 Morgan Wallace as Mr. McIntosh 
 George Beranger as Basil Pew 
 Tom Ricketts as Mr. Pierrepont 
 Warner Richmond as The Radical 
 Frank Sheridan as The Mayor 
 Tom McGuire as O'Leary 
 Gail Patrick (uncredited)

Reception
The New York Times wrote that Ruggles' "routine comedy method is so uproarious that it is in danger of obscuring his other talents" and that as Wilbur Todd he "produces an authentic and believable character in the principal role, playing down his scenes with admirable restraint." They wrote that as Wilbur's well-meaning wife Jessie, Mary Boland "is a comedienne who successfully resists the temptation to manufacture broad farce and easy laughs."

In the Toledo News-Bee journalist Allen Saunders made note that actor Charles Ruggles had been so long identified with sight and sound humor, that audiences had nearly forgotten that he could speak, and that in Mama Loves Papa he "has a chance to do a good job and he does it."  In describing the supporting cast and action, he wrote that with the team of Charles Ruggles and Mary Boland, the film was in "capable hands". He concluded by writing that "Mama Loves Papa is one of the best little comedies of the season". San Jose News wrote that the film was "an effervescent farce", that is "a perfect satire on the family next door."

Hal Erickson of Rovi wrote that the team of Mary Boland and Charles Ruggles collaborating with Norman Z. McLeod made for a delightful film. Noting that the film was "very basic material", he wrote that because of its stars, director, and screenwriter Nunnally Johnson, the film "emerges as something truly special." He also made note that the National Board of Review selected the film as one of the best of its year.

Recognition
1933, nomination for 'Best Picture' by National Board of Review

See also
 Mama Loves Papa (1945 film)

References

External links
 Mama Loves Papa (1933) at the Internet Movie Database

Films directed by Norman Z. McLeod
1933 films
1933 comedy films
American comedy films
Paramount Pictures films
American black-and-white films
1930s English-language films
1930s American films